Western Asia